This presents a partial list of products of the enterprise software company SAP SE.

Major units 

SAP S/4HANA (Enterprise Resource Planning on-premise and cloud)
SAP Business ByDesign (SME Cloud Enterprise Resource Planning)
SAP Business One (B1 on HANA) (Small enterprise Enterprise Resource Planning)
 SAP CRM (Customer Relationship Management)
 SAP ERP (Enterprise Resource Planning)
 SAP PLM (Product Lifecycle Management)
 SAP SCM (Supply Chain Management)
 SAP SRM (Supplier Relationship Management)

Business software 

 SAP Advanced Data Migration (ADP)
 SAP Advanced Planner and Optimizer
 SAP Analytics Cloud (SAC)
 SAP Advanced Business Application Programming (ABAP)
 SAP Apparel and Footwear Solution (AFS)
 SAP Business Information Warehouse (BW)
 SAP Business ByDesign (ByD)
SAP Business Explorer (Bex)
 SAP BusinessObjects Lumira
 SAP BusinessObjects Web Intelligence (Webi)
SAP Business One
 SAP Business Partner Screening
 SAP Business Intelligence (BI)
 SAP Business Workflow
 SAP Catalog Content Management
 SAP Cloud for Customer (C4C)
 SAP Cost Center Accounting (CCA)
 SAP Convergent Charging (CC)
 SAP Converged Cloud
 SAP Data Warehouse Cloud (DWC)
 SAP Design Studio
 SAP PRD2(P2)
 SAP Enterprise Buyer Professional (EBP)
 SAP Enterprise Learning
 SAP Portal (EP)
 SAP Exchange Infrastructure (XI) (From release 7.0 onwards, SAP XI has been renamed as SAP Process Integration (SAP PI))
 SAP Extended Warehouse Management (EWM)
 SAP FICO
 SAP BPC  (Business Planning and Consolidation, formerly OutlookSoft)
 SAP GRC (Governance, Risk and Compliance)
 SAP EHSM (Environment Health & Safety Management) 
 Enterprise Central Component (ECC)
 SAP ERP
 SAP HANA (formerly known as High-performance Analytics Appliance)
 SAP Human Resource Management Systems (HRMS)
 SAP SuccessFactors
 SAP Litmos Training Cloud
 SAP Information Design Tool (IDT)
 SAP Integrated Business Planning (IBP)
 SAP Internet Transaction Server (ITS) 
 SAP Incentive and Commission Management (ICM)
 SAP IT Operations Analytics (ITOA)
 SAP Jam
 SAP Knowledge Warehouse (KW)
 SAP Manufacturing
SAP Marketing Cloud
 SAP Materials Management (MM)
 SAP Master Data Management (MDM)
 SAP Plant Maintenance (PM)
 SAP Production Planning (PP)
 SAP Product Lifecycle Costing (PLC)
 SAP Profitability and Cost Management (PCM)
 SAP Project System (PS)
 SAP Rapid Deployment Solutions (RDS)
 SAP Service and Asset Management
 SAP Supply Network Collaboration (SNC)
 SAP Solutions for mobile business
 SAP Sales and Distribution (SD)
 SAP Solution Composer
 SAP Strategic Enterprise Management (SEM) 
 SAP Test Data Migration Server (TDMS)
 SAP Training and Event Management (TEM)
 SAP NetWeaver Application Server (Web AS)
 SAP xApps
 SAP Sales Cloud (previously: CallidusCloud)
 SAP Supply Chain Performance Management (SCPM)
 SAP Supply Chain Management (SCM)
 SAP Sustainability Performance Management (SUPM)
 SAP S/4HANA
 SAP Master Data Governance (MDG)
 SAP S/4HANA Cloud

Industry software
 SAP for Retail 
 SAP for Utilities (ISU)
 SAP for Public Sector (IS PSCD)
 SAP for Oil & Gas (IS Oil & Gas)
 SAP for Media (ISM)
 SAP for Telecommunications (IST)
 SAP for Healthcare (ISH)
 SAP Banking (SAP Banking)
 SAP for Insurance (SAP for Insurance)
 SAP Financial Services Network (FSN)
 SAP Shipping Services Network (SSN)
 Engineering Construction & Operations (EC&O)
 SAP IS Airlines & Defense
SAP for Discrete Industries and Mill Products (IS DIMP)

Software for small and midsize enterprises
 SAP Business One (Small enterprise ERP 6.2, 6.5, 2004, 2005, 2007, 8.8x, 9.X, 10.x)
 SAP Business ByDesign (SME Cloud ERP)

Platforms and frameworks 
 SAP Cloud Platform (Its brand name is removed in January 2021 in favor of SAP Business Technology Platform)
SAP Enterprise Services Architecture
 SAP NetWeaver Platform
 SAP NetWeaver Portal (formerly SAP Enterprise Portal)
 SAP NetWeaver BI (formerly SAP NetWeaver BW- "BW" is still used to describe the underlying data warehouse area and accelerator components) 
 SAP NetWeaver Visual Composer
 SAP Auto-ID Infrastructure
 SAP Composite Application Framework
 SAP NetWeaver Development Infrastructure
 SAP NetWeaver Identity Management
 SAP NetWeaver Single Sign-On
 SAP Business Connector (deprecated/removed from product range)
 SAP HANA
SAP IQ
SAP AppGyver

Legacy platforms
 SAP R/2
 SAP R/3

Others 
 OpenUI5
 SAP CCMS, monitoring program
 SAP GUI
 eCATT
 SAP Central Process Scheduling, process automation and job scheduler
 SAP Fiori for mobile devices announced in May 2013
 SAP Solution Manager
 Sybase ASE
Sybase SQL Anywhere
 SAP Ariba
 SAP Fieldglass
 SAP Concur
 SAP Hybris
 SAP Litmos

References

SAP products
SAP products
SAP SE